This article lists potential candidates for the Republican nomination for vice president of the United States in the 2024 election. The 2024 Republican nominee for president of the United States will choose their running mate at some point in 2024.

Background
Multiple reporters, political analysts and commentators have noted that Trump selecting Pence to be his running mate once again would be highly unlikely following rifts between the two over the future of the Republican Party and Pence's attempts to distance himself from the former president. In June 2022, the House Select Committee on the January 6 Attack found that Trump said Pence "deserved" calls to be hanged on the day of the attack. Pence has stated that he has no interest in seeking the vice-presidential nomination again.

Several individuals have received speculation about possible selection as vice presidential nominee in 2024 including Senator Tim Scott of South Carolina, Governor Glenn Youngkin of Virginia, former Ambassador Nikki Haley of South Carolina, Senator Ted Cruz of Texas, Governor Ron DeSantis of Florida, Governor Kim Reynolds of Iowa, Senator Joni Ernst of Iowa, Senator Rick Scott of Florida, and Lieutenant Governor Jeanette Nuñez of Florida.

Reportedly, Trump has "repeatedly" discussed the possibility of choosing United States Representative Marjorie Taylor Greene as his running mate. Greene has claimed that she is in talks with Trump to become his running mate.

Media speculation about possible running mates

Federal executive branch officials

Members of Congress

Governors

Others

Opinion polling

Notes

References

Vice presidency of the United States